Gobinda Prasad Mahavidyalaya, established in 1985, is the general degree college in Amarkanan, Gangajalghati Block, Bankura district. It offers undergraduate courses in arts. It is affiliated to  Bankura University.

Departments

Arts

Bengali
English
Geography
History

Accreditation
The college is recognized by the University Grants Commission (UGC).

See also

References

External links 
Gobindaprasad Mahavidyalaya

Universities and colleges in Bankura district
Colleges affiliated to Bankura University
Educational institutions established in 1985
1985 establishments in West Bengal